Focus on the Family (FOTF or FotF) is a fundamentalist Protestant organization founded in 1977 in Southern California by James Dobson, based in Colorado Springs, Colorado. The group is one of a number of evangelical parachurch organizations that rose to prominence in the 1980s. As of the 2017 tax filing year, Focus on the Family declared itself to be a church, "primarily to protect the confidentiality of our donors." Traditionally, entities considered churches have been ones that have regular worship services and congregants.

It most prominently lobbies against LGBT rights — including those related to marriage, adoption, and parenting — labeling it a "particularly evil lie of Satan". Focus on the Family has been criticized by psychiatrists, psychologists, and social scientists for misrepresenting their research in order to bolster its religious ideology and political agenda, as well as for their anti-LGBT views. The organization also seeks to change public policy in the areas of sex education, creationism, abortion, state-sponsored school prayer, gambling, drugs, and enforcement of their interpretation of proper gender roles.

The core promotional activities of the organization include the flagship daily radio broadcast hosted by its president Jim Daly together with co-host Focus VP John Fuller. Focus also provides free resources in line with the group's views, and publishes books, magazines, videos, and audio recordings.

The organization also produces programs for targeted audiences, such as Adventures in Odyssey and Ribbits! for children, and dramas.

History 

From 1977 to 2003, James Dobson served as the sole leader of the organization. In 2003, Donald P. Hodel became president and chief executive officer, tasked with the day-to-day operations. Dobson remained chairman of the board of directors, with chiefly creative and speaking duties. In March 2005, Hodel retired and Jim Daly, formerly the Vice President in charge of Focus on the Family's International Division, assumed the role of president and chief executive officer.

In November 2008, the organization announced that it was eliminating 202 jobs, representing 18 percent of its workforce. The organization also cut its budget from $160 million in fiscal 2008 to $138 million for fiscal 2009.

In February 2009, Dobson resigned his chairmanship. He left Focus on the Family in early 2010, and subsequently founded Family Talk as a non-profit organization and launched a new broadcast that began airing nationally on May 3, 2010. He is no longer affiliated with Focus on the Family.

On June 23, 2017, Vice President Mike Pence attended the organization's 40th anniversary celebration; at the event, he praised founder James Dobson, stated that President Donald Trump is an ally of the organization, and added that the Trump administration supports its goals (including the abolition of Planned Parenthood). Pence's attendance at the event, along with Focus on the Family's stances on LGBT rights, was criticized by the Human Rights Campaign.

In its IRS Form 990 for Tax Year 2015, dated October 26, 2017, Focus on the Family for the first time declared itself a "church, convention of churches or association of churches", claiming that it was no longer required to file the IRS disclosure form and that the sources and disposition of its $89 million budget were "Not for public inspection". Tax attorney Gail Harmon, who advises nonprofit organizations on tax law, said she found the declaration "shocking", noting that "There's nothing about them that meets the traditional definition of what a church is. They don't have a congregation, they don't have the rites of various parts of a person's life." A spokesperson for the organization stated that it changed its status "primarily to protect the confidentiality of our donors". By 2023, the organization would have offices in 14 countries and partnerships in 60 countries, for an international presence in 98 countries.

Programs

Marriage and family
Focus on the Family strongly opposes same-sex marriage, civil unions, and domestic partnerships.

The organization has referred to the LGBT rights movement as a "particularly evil lie of Satan".

Wait No More
Focus on the Family's Wait No More ministry works with adoption agencies, church leaders and ministry partners to recruit families to adopt children from foster care. In Colorado, the number of children waiting for adoption dropped from about 800 to 350, due in-part to the efforts of Wait No More. Focus on the Family's efforts to encourage adoption among Christian families is part of a larger effort by Evangelicals to, in their perception, live out what they see as the "biblical mandate" to help children.

Option Ultrasound Program
Focus on the Family's Option Ultrasound Program (OUP) provides grants to crisis pregnancy centers to pay the cost of ultrasound machines or sonography training. Focus on the Family began OUP in 2004 with the goal of convincing women not to have abortions. FOTF officials said that ultrasound services help a woman better understand her pregnancy and baby's development, creating an important "bonding opportunity" between "mother and unborn child".

A study released in February 2012 shows that ultrasounds do not have a direct impact on an abortion decision. In 2011, FOTF announced that they would like to talk with pro-choice groups like Planned Parenthood to work towards the shared goal of making abortion less common. Rep. Michele Bachmann (R-Minn.) introduced a sonogram bill in 2011 and, citing Focus on the Family, told Congress that "78 percent of women who see and hear the fetal heartbeat choose life." She was later corrected by Focus on the Family, which released a statement saying they did not release such data.

Boundless.org
Boundless.org is Focus on the Family's website for young adults featuring articles, a blog, a podcast, and a conference. The website covers topics such as singleness, dating, relationships, popular culture, career, and sex.

Pluggedin.com
Plugged In is a Focus on the Family publication and associated website created for families that reviews magazines, films, books, music, and TV shows.

Day of Dialogue

The Day of Dialogue was a student event which took place April 16. Since 2018 the event is no longer marked on a single date, or organized nationally. Founders described the goal of the event, created in opposition to the anti-bullying and anti-homophobic Day of Silence, as "encouraging honest and respectful conversation among students about God's design for sexuality." It was previously known as the Day of Truth and was founded by the Alliance Defense Fund in 2005. In 2007, Exodus International began supporting the Day of Truth, an event created by Alliance Defending Freedom (ADF) in 2005 that challenges homosexuality. In 2009, the ADF announced they had passed on their leadership role for the event to Exodus. In October 2010, Exodus announced they would no longer support the event. President Alan Chambers stated they realised they needed to "equip kids to live out biblical tolerance and grace while treating their neighbors as they'd like to be treated, whether they agree with them or not", adding that the Day of Truth was becoming too divisive. Chambers said that Exodus had not changed its position on homosexuality, rather they were reevaluating how to best communicate their message. Focus on the Family subsequently took leadership of the event, and renamed it the Day of Dialogue.

National Day of Prayer

The National Day of Prayer Task Force is an American evangelical conservative Christian non-profit organization which organizes, coordinates, and presides over Evangelical Christian religious observances each year on the National Day of Prayer. The website of the NDP Task Force states that "its business affairs are separate" from those of Focus on the Family, but also that "between 1990 and 1993, Focus on the Family did provide grants in support of the NDP Task Force" and that "Focus on the Family is compensated for services rendered." Shirley Dobson, wife of James Dobson, was chairwoman of the NDP Task Force from 1991 until 2016, when Anne Graham Lotz, daughter of evangelist Billy Graham, assumed the post.

Radio Theatre
Radio Theatre is a program run by Focus on the Family that makes both original and adapted radio dramas. Much of the staff involved with Adventures in Odyssey is also involved with Radio Theatre such as Paul McCusker.
They have made adaptations of many novels including Les Miserables and Anne of Green Gables as well as an adaptation of the complete Chronicles of Narnia. Radio Theatre often hires famous actors to be a part of their adaptations such as Andy Serkis.

Former ministries

Love Won Out

Focus on the Family formed Love Won Out, an ex-gay ministry in 1998. In 2009, it was sold to Exodus International.

Political positions and activities
Focus on the Family's 501(c)(3) status prevents them from advocating any individual political candidate. FOTF also has an affiliated group, Family Policy Alliance, though the two groups are legally separate. As a 501(c)(4) social welfare group, Family Policy Alliance has fewer political lobbying restrictions. FOTF's revenue in 2012 was US$90.5 million, and that of Family Policy Alliance (formerly CitizenLink) was US$8 million.

Focus on the Family maintains a strong stand against abortion, and provides grant funding and medical training to assist crisis pregnancy centers (CPCs; also known as pregnancy resource centers) in obtaining ultrasound machines. According to the organization, this funding, which has allowed CPCs to provide pregnant women with live sonogram images of the developing fetus, has led directly to the birth of over 1500 babies who would have otherwise been aborted. The organization has been staunchly opposed to public funding for elective abortions.

Focus on the Family has been a prominent supporter of the pseudoscience of intelligent design, publishing pro-intelligent design articles in its Citizen magazine and selling intelligent design videos on its website. Focus on the Family co-published the intelligent design videotape Unlocking the Mystery of Life with the Discovery Institute, hub of the intelligent design movement.

In New Zealand, Focus on the Family supported a Citizens Initiated Referendum on the repeal of section 59 of the Crimes Act 1961, which placed limits on the physical disciplining of children.

Focus on the Family Singapore came under criticism in October 2014 over allegations of sexism and promoting gender stereotypes during their workshops on managing relationships for junior college students. The workshop received a complaint from both a Hwa Chong Junior College student, as well as negative feedback from the college management as being 'ineffective' and stopped before the end of the year.

Following the 2022 U.S. Supreme Court decision to overturn Roe v. Wade, Focus on the Family published an article on its Daily Citizen site urging conservative Christians to engage in a "cultural civil war" against "radical abortion laws" implemented in left-leaning states. This added to speculation that political violence similar to the January 6th attacks could be accepted or encouraged on the grounds of opposing abortion rights.

2008 presidential campaign
In the 2008 United States presidential election, Focus on the Family shifted from supporting Mike Huckabee, to not supporting any candidate, to accepting the Republican ticket once Sarah Palin was added. Prior to the election, a television and letter campaign was launched predicting terrorist attacks in four U.S. cities and equating the U.S. with Nazi Germany. This publicity was condemned by the Anti Defamation League. Within a month before the general election, Focus on the Family began distributing a 16-page letter titled Letter from 2012 in Obama's America, which describes an imagined American future in which "many of our freedoms have been taken away by a liberal Supreme Court of the United States and a majority of Democrats in both the House of Representatives and the Senate." According to USA Today, the letter "is part of an escalation in rhetoric from Christian right activists" trying to paint Democratic Party presidential nominee Senator Barack Obama in a negative light.

Focus on the Family Action supported Senator Saxby Chambliss (R-Ga.) in his successful December 2, 2008, runoff election win. The organization, according to the Colorado Independent, donated $35,310 in radio ads to the Chambliss runoff campaign effort. As the Independent reports, the Focus-sponsored ads were aired in about a dozen Georgia markets. The commercials were produced in the weeks after Focus laid off 202 employees, some 20 percent of its workforce, because of the national economic crisis.

Opposition to same-sex marriage

Dobson spoke at the 2004 rally against gay marriage called Mayday for Marriage. It was here for the first time that he endorsed a presidential candidate, George W. Bush. Here he denounced the Supreme Court rulings in favor of gay rights, and he urged rally participants to get out and vote so that the battle against gay rights could be won in the Senate.

In an interview with Christianity Today, Dobson also explained that he was not in favor of civil unions. He stated that civil unions are just same-sex marriage under a different name. The main priority of the opposing same-sex marriage movement is to define marriage on the federal level as between a man and a woman and combat the passage of civil unions later.

Civil rights advocacy groups identify Focus on the Family as a major opponent of gay rights. The Southern Poverty Law Center, a civil rights and hate group monitoring organization, described Focus on the Family as one of a "dozen major groups [which] help drive the religious right's anti-gay crusade". The SPLC does not list Focus on the Family as a hate group, however, since it opposes homosexuality "on strictly Biblical grounds".

Focus on the Family is a member of ProtectMarriage.com, a coalition formed to sponsor California Proposition 8, a ballot initiative to restrict marriage to opposite-sex couples, which passed in 2008, but was subsequently struck down as being unconstitutional by a federal court in Perry v. Schwarzenegger.

Misrepresentation of research
Social scientists have criticized Focus on the Family for misrepresenting their research in order to bolster its own perspective. Researcher Judith Stacey, whose work was used by Focus on the Family to claim that gays and lesbians do not make good parents, said that the claim was "a direct misrepresentation of the research". She elaborated, "Whenever you hear Focus on the Family, legislators or lawyers say, 'Studies prove that children do better in families with a mother and a father,' they are referring to studies which compare two-parent heterosexual households to single-parent households. The studies they are talking about do not cite research on families headed by gay and lesbian couples." FOTF claimed that Stacey's allegation was without merit and that their position is that the best interests of children are served when there is a father and a mother. "We haven't said anything about sexual orientation", said Glenn Stanton.

James Dobson cited the research of Kyle Pruett and Carol Gilligan in a Time magazine guest article in the service of a claim that two women cannot raise a child; upon finding out that her work had been used in this way, Gilligan wrote a letter to Dobson asking him to apologize and to cease and desist from citing her work, describing herself as "mortified to learn that you had distorted my work ... Not only did you take my research out of context, you did so without my knowledge to support discriminatory goals that I do not agree with ... there is nothing in my research that would lead you to draw the stated conclusions you did in the Time article." Pruett wrote a similar letter, in which he said that Dobson "cherry-picked a phrase to shore up highly (in my view) discriminatory purposes. This practice is condemned in real science, common though it may be in pseudo-science circles. There is nothing in my longitudinal research or any of my writings to support such conclusions", and asked that FOTF not cite him again without permission.

After Elizabeth Saewyc's research on teen suicide was used by Focus on the Family to promote conversion therapy she said that "the research has been hijacked for somebody's political purposes or ideological purposes and that's worrisome", and that research in fact linked the suicide rate among LGBT teens to harassment, discrimination, and closeting. Other scientists who have criticized Focus on the Family for misrepresenting their findings include Robert Spitzer, Gary Remafedi, and Angela Phillips.

Football advertisements
In 2010, Focus on the Family bought ad time during Super Bowl XLIV to air a commercial featuring Heisman Trophy winning Florida Gators quarterback Tim Tebow and his mother, Pam. In the ad, Pam described Tim as a "miracle baby" who "almost didn't make it into this world", and further elaborated that "with all our family's been through, we have to be tough" (after which Pam was promptly tackled by Tim). The ad directed viewers to the organization's website.

Women's rights groups asked CBS not to air the then-unseen ad, arguing that it was divisive. Planned Parenthood released a video response of its own featuring fellow NFL player Sean James. The claim that Tebow's family chose not to perform an abortion was also widely criticized; critics felt that the claim was implausible because it would be unlikely for doctors to recommend the procedure because abortion is illegal in the Philippines. CBS's decision to run the ad was also criticized for deviating from its past policy to reject advocacy-type ads during the Super Bowl, including ads by left-leaning groups such as PETA, MoveOn.org and the United Church of Christ (which wanted to run an ad that was pro-same-sex marriage). However, CBS stated that "we have for some time moderated our approach to advocacy submissions after it became apparent that our stance did not reflect public sentiment or industry norms on the issue."

Focus on the Family produced another commercial which ran during the second quarter of the January 14, 2012 Denver Broncos-New England Patriots AFC Divisional Playoff broadcast on CBS, featuring children reciting the Bible verse John 3:16. The ad did not generate nearly the amount of controversy that surrounded the Super Bowl commercial. It did gain some national media attention, and president Jim Daly stated in a press release that its purpose was to "help everyone understand some numbers are more important than the ones on the scoreboard."

Recognition and awards
In 2008, Dobson's Focus on the Family program was nominated for induction into the National Radio Hall of Fame. Nominations were made by the 157 members of the Hall of Fame and voting on inductees was handed over to the public using online voting. The nomination drew the ire of gay rights activists, who launched efforts to have the program removed from the nominee list and to vote for other nominees to prevent Focus from winning. However, on July 18, 2008, it was announced that the program had won and would be inducted into the Radio Hall of Fame in a ceremony on November 8, 2008. Truth Wins Out, a gay rights group, protested the ceremony with over 300 protesters.

Headquarters

The Focus on the Family headquarters is a four building,  complex located off of Interstate 25 in northern Colorado Springs, Colorado, with its own ZIP Code (80995). The buildings consist of the Administration building, International building, Welcome Center and Operations building (currently unused), and totals 526,070 square feet.

Focus on the Family moved to its current headquarters from Pomona, California, in 1991, with 1,200 employees. In 2002, the number of employees peaked at 1,400. By September 2011, after years of layoffs, they had 650 employees remaining. Christopher Ott of Salon said in 1998 that the FOTF campus has "handsome new brick buildings, professional landscaping and even its own traffic signs" and that "The buildings and grounds are well-maintained and comfortable. If there is any ostentatious or corrupt influence here, it is nowhere in sight."

References

External links

 
 FOTF Programs via Streaming Audio
 Focus on the Family New Zealand
 Boundless Webzine

 
1977 establishments in Colorado
501(c)(3) organizations
Anti-abortion organizations in the United States
Christian organizations based in the United States
Conservative organizations in the United States
Evangelical parachurch organizations
Evangelicalism in Colorado
Intelligent design advocates
Non-profit organizations based in Colorado
Organizations based in Colorado Springs, Colorado
Organizations established in 1977
Organizations that oppose LGBT rights in the United States
Political organizations based in the United States
Religion in Colorado Springs, Colorado
Right-wing politics in the United States
Westwood One